Del Rey Lagoon Park is a  Los Angeles municipal park in the Playa Del Rey neighborhood with a lagoon that is part of the greater Ballona Creek watershed.

The park features lighted baseball fields, lighted basketball courts and a children’s playground. There is a dedicated parking lot just off Pacific Avenue. 

The depth of the lagoon circa 1959 was four to six feet (1.2-1.8 m). The lagoon is a place where “wild ducks swim beside the domestic varieties that are cast-off Easter presents for city-dwellers’ children.” Among the wild waterfowl is a “large population of bufflehead ducks, great blue herons and coots.”

History

Del Rey and Ballona Lagoons were originally part of the same Ballona Creek estuary channel system. 

The lagoon played host to crew races in the first decade of the 20th century. The lagoon played host to the Los Angeles Motordrome racetrack, “world's first board track built for race cars” that was located adjacent to the lagoon from 1910 to 1913. 
 

The lagoon had a tidal exit channel as recently as 1929, before the Venice Oil Field was discovered and the Ballona Creek delta was reworked, by the 1930s flood-control channelization as well as the 1960s creation of Marina Del Rey.

Circa the 1950s, a water-control gate refilled the lagoon at high tide. The lagoon had previously been a salt marsh “subject to tidal flow,” but Del Rey “suffered as recreational lagoon because of the great change in water level.” In 1979, a motorized gate was opened “monthly to flush out the now land-locked pond.” Community members would remove grass and litter from the lagoon by hand to prevent a build-up of smelly algae.

Sailing classes were offered at the lagoon by the city parks department as recently as 1991. The lagoon had “a little wharf where the Los Angeles Recreation and Parks Department launches its canoeing classes.” In 1959 “the oblong-shaped lagoon” was described as a “boating paradise,” with “28 small boats of all sizes and kinds” available for public use, including canoes, sailboats, rowboats, kayaks, outriggers and paddlewheel boats. In 1973, the city offered “children’s boating classes every Saturday morning at the lagoon, giving information on handling canoes and sabots. Boating is open to children only and there is no swimming allowed.”

See also
Ballona Lagoon
Oxford Basin

References

External link
Del Rey Lagoon Park eBird Hotspot

Parks in Los Angeles County, California
Ballona Creek
Playa del Rey, Los Angeles
Bodies of water of Los Angeles County, California
Wetlands and marshes of Los Angeles County, California